The Civil War Campaign Medal is considered the first campaign service medal of the United States Armed Forces.  The decoration was awarded to members of the United States Armed Forces who had served in the American Civil War between 1861 and 1865.

Establishment
The medal was first authorized in 1905 for the fortieth anniversary of the Civil War's conclusion. The blue and gray ribbon denotes the respective uniform colors of the U.S. and Confederate troops. The Army Civil War Campaign Medal was established by the United States War Department on January 21, 1907, by General Orders Number 12. To qualify, a soldier had to serve between April 15, 1861, and April 9, 1865. The closing date was extended to August 20, 1866, date of President Johnson's Proclamation ending the war. The corresponding Navy Civil War Medal was established on June 27, 1908, by Navy Department.

The reverse has the words "The Civil War 1861-1865" encircled by a wreath. The medal was designed by Francis D. Millet, a noted sculptor who perished on the RMS Titanic in 1912. The medal was struck at the Philadelphia Mint. Civil War Campaign Medal No. 1 was issued to Maj. Gen. Charles F. Humphrey on May 26, 1909.  

The medal was originally established as a badge, because Congress would not approve a medal due to the costs involved. The War Department was authorized to create badges, so it did. This interest was due in large part to the fact that several senior military officers were veterans of the Civil War. Although some recipients may have worn some form of the ribbon, the monies necessary to mint and issue the medal were not appropriated by Congress until 1956 – 91 years after the war ended. It was this act that provided U.S. government purchase for the medal to all qualified veterans, whether they were on active or inactive duty.

In 1918, for those who had been cited for gallantry in action, the Silver Citation Star was authorized as a device to the medal. Only six Citation Stars were awarded. 

There is a direct relationship between U.S. campaign streamers and the medal that a campaign represents. The streamer represents the unit's participation in a campaign and the medal represents an individual's participation in that campaign (U.S. Army – some differences for the U.S. Navy). When a campaign is established, participating unit's are authorized a streamer and each service member assigned to the unit during that same time is authorized the medal.  Sometimes these medals are campaign medals, other times they are service medals, but that streamer/medal relationship normally remains. Units in the U.S. Army that trace their heritage and lineage to the Civil War are entitled to display a battle streamer for the Civil War on their flagpoles. This streamer is half blue and half gray, the color theme of the second ribbon design. Units with Confederate lineage use campaign streamers with the gray edge up and units with Union lineage use campaign streamers with the blue edge up. The campaign lettering requires two distinct sets of streamers for each campaign, one set for each side.

Regulations
Army Regulation (AR) 600-8-22, Chapter V, Section III, paragraph 5–20 states the following - 

Civil War Campaign Medal This medal was established by War Department General Order 12, 1907. It is awarded for service between 15 April 1861 and 9 April 1865, or in Texas between 15 April 1861 and 20 August 1866.

Navy and Marine Corps Awards Manual (Rev. 1953), Part IV, Section 2, Paragraph 1 states the following - 

Civil War Campaign Medal This medal is issued to officers and enlisted personnel of the Navy and Marine Corps who served in the naval service during the Civil War, between 15 April 1861 and 9 April 1865. (Special Orders No. 81 and 82 of 27 June 1908.)

References

External links

US Army Institute of Heraldry: Civil War Campaign Medal
 McDowell, Charles P., Foxfall Medals, Retrieved 2008-11-03.

1905 establishments in the United States
Awards established in 1905
United States campaign medals
Military awards and decorations of the American Civil War